Global Mobile Information System Simulator (GloMoSim) is a network protocol simulation software that simulates wireless and wired network systems. 

GloMoSim is designed using the parallel discrete event simulation capability provided by Parsec, a parallel programming language.  GloMoSim currently supports protocols for a purely wireless network. 

It uses the Parsec compiler  to compile the simulation protocols.

Parsec
Parsec is a C-based simulation language, developed by the Parallel Computing Laboratory at UCLA, for sequential and parallel execution of discrete-event simulation models.

Development
GloMoSim is no longer under active development

References

Wireless networking
Computer network analysis